Lý Thánh Tông (30 March 1023 – 1 February 1072), personal name Lý Nhật Tôn  , temple name Thánh Tông, was the third emperor of the Lý dynasty and the 8th ruler of the Vietnamese kingdom Đại Việt. In his reign, Lý Thánh Tông promoted the agricultural development, reducing some harsh laws and building many Confucianist and Buddhist institutions, most notably the first Temple of Literature in Vietnam (1072). He also fought several successful wars with Champa, resulting in the expansion of Vietnamese territory to the areas which are Quảng Bình Province and Quảng Trị Province today. Chinese sources identify Lý Nhật Tôn as the Viet king that dared to
claim imperial status, which for the Chinese was a direct challenge to their view of the world that prelude to the Song-Viet war in 1070s.

Early life 
Lý Nhật Tôn was the eldest son of the second emperor Lý Phật Mã and Queen Mai Thị. He was born on March 30, 1023, at Càn Đức palace. Unlike his father and grandfather, he had not lived in the disturbed atmosphere of Hoa Lư. He came of age witnessing and participating in the exuberance of Lý Phật Mã's reign. His father had readily delegated important tasks to him. He led soldiers against rebels, he judged offenders, he presided over the court in his father's absence, and he always knew that he would be king. In 1033, he was conferred crown prince after his father ascended the throne as Prince Khai Hoàng (開皇王).

Reign

Domestic
Just after succession, Lý Nhật Tôn shortened the kingdom's name from Đại Cồ Việt to Đại Việt (literally "Great Viet"), initiating the most prosperous epoch throughout the history of Vietnam under that name.

Lý Thánh Tông incorporated both Sinic and Indic elements into his court. In 1059 he ordered all palace officers who would approach him to wear contemporary Chinese-style headgear and footwear. Junior royal servants, scribes (thư gia), ten of whom were promoted to law officers in 1067. In 1063, at 40 years old and still without a son and having visited shrines and temples throughout the kingdom to pray for an heir, he traveled to the Pháp Vân pagoda, about thirty kilometers east of Thăng Long at the ancient site of Luy Lâu, where Shi Xie had governed at the turn of the third century. This was among the first Buddhist temples to be built in the Red River Delta. Thánh Tông found interest on a young girl named Ỷ Lan who ignored the king's hubbub while continued working on the mulberry farm, and then took her as queen. Three years later she gave birth for prince Lý Càn Đức. It appears that it was Lý Nhật Tôn who first conferred upon Lý Công Uẩn and Lý Phật Mã posthumous titles derived from Chinese dynastic usage.

In order to educate people with Chinese classics, in 1070 Thánh Tông authorized the construction of Văn Miếu, the Temple of Literature, a scholarly shrine and archive in Thăng Long that was stocked with clay statues of the Duke of Zhou and of Confucius and his followers and paintings of seventy-two other disciples of Confucius. Thánh Tông also relied on his chief minister Lý Đạo Thành to educate his four-year-old son Lý Càn Đức in Chinese classics. Thánh Tông also reorganized the royal army, equipped them with cavalries and catapults. In 1068, Thánh Tông ordered the war boats to be repaired. In making plans for the Champa campaign he relied on Lý Thường Kiệt (1019–1105), the ranking military officer at court.

Foreign relations

After Nong Zhigao's rebellion was suppressed in 1055, the Guangnan West Circuit Fiscal Commissioner, Wang Han (fl. 1043–1063), feared that Nong Zhigao's kinsmen Nùng Tông Đán intended to plunder the region after he crossed the Song border in 1057. Wang Han took a personal visit to Nùng Tông Đán's camp and spoke with Nong Zhigao's son, explaining that seeking "Interior Dependency" status would alienate them from the Vietnamese, but if they remained outside of China proper they could safely act as loyal frontier militia. A local Song official, Xiao Zhu, agitated for military action against Thăng Long to settle the border question. They secretly trained military units and sheltered refugees from the Vietnamese side, including army deserters. The contradiction between the pacific pronouncements of the Song court and the devious, provocative policy of local Song officials angered Lý Nhật Tôn. In 1059, Lý Nhật Tôn to launch a punitive attack across the border, declaring his hate for "Sung's untrustworthiness". After a year or so of attacks and counter-attacks, in which the local Sung officials fared poorly, a parley between Sung and Vietnamese envoys produced a temporary calm as some activist Sung officials were dismissed and the Sung court officially accepted Thăng Long's explanation of events. According to the Chinese, Lý Nhật Tôn violated propriety by arrogantly proclaiming himself an emperor. Because of recently violence in the borders, local Song officials went so far as to conspire with the Cham king to put pressure on the Vietnamese. A Vietnamese embassy was permitted to offer tribute to the court of Renzong in Kaifeng, arriving on 8 February 1063 to deliver gifts, including nine tamed elephants. The king sent a second embassy to the Sung court in 1067 to congratulate Shenzong's coronation, and received gifts from the Sung emperor including a golden belt, silver ingots, 300 bolts of silk, two horses, a saddle inlaid with gold and silver plating.

As Champa constantly harassed the area near the border between the two nations and sometimes intruded deeply to loot, in 1069 Lý Thánh Tông himself led an seaborne invasion of Champa. He defeated the Cham army, burned Vijaya, and captured the king of Champa, Rudravarman III on Khmer territories. Rudravarman III implored Lý Thánh Tông to release him in exchange for three areas, known as Địa Lý, Ma Linh, and Bố Chính. These now form part of Quảng Bình Province and Quảng Trị Province.

Nhật Tôn's victorious army brought back thousands more Cham prisoners and resettled them near capital Thăng Long. These captives contributed Cham music to Viet court; they included Tao Tang, a Chinese monk who had been living at the Cham court. Under the guidance of his new royal patron Nhật Tôn, he established Đại Việt's third Thiền Buddhist sect. Alongside the popular Vinītaruci sect that Lý Công Uẩn had favored and the more ascetic and scholarly Võ Ngôn Thông sect of Lý Phật Mã, the kingdom acquired a princely order that was patronized by later Lý monarchs and catered to court interests, but also incorporated more cosmopolitan influences, including elements of Chinese Buddhism.

Religious activities

Unlike his father and grandfather, Thánh Tông does not seem to have been much engaged with either the Buddhist or the spirit world. In 1057 Thánh Tông erected a Buddha statue in Thăng Long as the reincarnation of a pantheon of spirits, including the ancient Lạc saint Gióng and the Chinese god of war, Chen Wu, while several years later the minister Lý Đạo Thành erected a Buddha statue and established a garden dedicated to a Bodhisattva in the grounds of the provincial Temple of Literature in Nghệ An. In the capital, Thánh Tông ordered the construction of a temple called Phạn Vương Đế Thích for the worship of Indra (Đế Thích). Also in the same year he constructed a royal cult linked Hindu-Buddhist king of the god Indra as well as Brahma (Phạn Vương); every year, before the Tết lunar new year two days, Vietnamese kings and his entourage would go to the shrine of Indra to worship. He also had two temples Thiên Phúc and Thiên Thọ, golden statues of Brahma and Sakra to worship. In early 1072, Thánh Tông went up to the mount of Tản Viên to worship the mountain spirit.

Era name
In January 1072, he suddenly died at the age of 49, having ruled for 17 years. During his rule, he used 5 era names:
 Long Thụy Thái Bình (1054–1058)
 Chương Thánh Gia Khánh (1059–1065)
 Long Chương Thiên Tự (1066–1067)
 Thiên Huống Bảo Tượng (1068)
 Thần Vũ (1069–1072)

Family
 Parents
 Lý Phật Mã (李佛瑪, 1000 – 1054)
 Empress Mai
 Wives
 Empress Thượng Dương
 Lady Ỷ Lan (倚蘭) or Lê Khiết Nương (黎潔娘)
 8 other unknowns
 Children
 Lý Càn Đức (李乾德, 1066 – 1128), first son
 Lý Càn Quyết, second son
 Sùng Hiền Hầu
 Princess Động Thiên
 Princess Thiên Thành
 Lý Thị Ngọc Kiều (李氏玉嬌, 1042 – 1113), adopted daughter

Ancestry

References

Citations

Bibliography 

 

 
 

 
 
 
  

 

1023 births
1072 deaths
Lý dynasty emperors
People from Bắc Ninh province
11th-century Vietnamese monarchs
Vietnamese monarchs